George Goudie Chisholm FRSE FRSGS LLD (1 May 1850 – 9 February 1930) was a Scottish geographer. He authored the first English-language textbook on economic geography: Handbook on Commercial Geography (1889) and the World Gazetteer, later to become known as The Times Gazetteer.

Life

Chisolm was born in Edinburgh on 1 May 1850, the son of an actuary. He was educated at the Royal High School in Edinburgh, and then the University of Edinburgh, graduating in 1870.

He lectured on Geography in London from 1883 to 1908 and then returned to the University of Edinburgh where he lectured until 1923.

He served as Secretary to the Scottish Geographical Society for 15 years.

In 1923 he received an honorary doctorate (LLD) from the University, and elected a Fellow of the Royal Society of Edinburgh in 1924.

He authored the first English-language textbook on economic geography: Handbook on Commercial Geography (1889). It was later revised by Kenneth Stamp.. He authored a review of Friedrich Naumann's Pan-German work on Central Europe which appeared in The Scottish Geographical Magazine issue 33, which condemned the aggressively militaristic overtones of Naumann's nationalistic work. His World Gazetteer of 1895, a huge project, later became commonly known as The Times Gazetteer.

On Sunday 9 February 1930 he died quietly on a tram in Edinburgh. He was 79.

Publications
The Two Hemispheres: A Popular Account of Peoples and Countries of the World (1882)
A Pronouncing Vocabulary of Modern Geographical Names (1885)
Handbook of Commercial Geography (1889)+ (1908)
Longman's School Geography for South Africa (1891)
Gazetteer of the World (1895) published by Longman
Europe (2 vols) (1899)
Junior School Geography
Longman's School Geography for India and Ceylon
The World As It Is: A Popular Account of Peoples and Countries of the Earth
A Smaller Commercial Geography
Longman's School Geography for Australasia

Family

He married Florence Jones in 1884.

Recognition

In 1917, he was awarded the Charles P. Daly Medal of the American Geographical Society.

References

External links
 
 

1850 births
1930 deaths
Scottish geographers
Academics from Edinburgh
Alumni of the University of Edinburgh
Academics of the University of Edinburgh
Fellows of the Royal Society of Edinburgh
Fellows of the Royal Scottish Geographical Society
Scientists from Edinburgh